The International Maritime Organization (IMO, French: Organisation maritime internationale) is a specialised agency of the United Nations responsible for regulating shipping. The IMO was established following agreement at a UN conference held in Geneva in 1948 and the IMO came into existence ten years later, meeting for the first time in 1959. Headquartered in London, United Kingdom, IMO currently has 175 Member States and three Associate Members.

The IMO's primary purpose is to develop and maintain a comprehensive regulatory framework for shipping and its remit today includes maritime safety, environmental concerns, legal matters, technical co-operation, maritime security and the efficiency of shipping. IMO is governed by an assembly of members which meets every two years. Its finance and organization is administered by a council of 40 members elected from the assembly. The work of IMO is conducted through five committees and these are supported by technical subcommittees. Other UN organisations may observe the proceedings of the IMO. Observer status is granted to qualified non-governmental organisations.

IMO is supported by a permanent secretariat of employees who are representative of the organisation's members. The secretariat is composed of a Secretary-General who is periodically elected by the assembly, and various divisions such as those for marine safety, environmental protection and a conference section.

History

IMO was established in 1948 following a UN conference in Geneva to bring the regulation of the safety of shipping into an international framework. Hitherto such international conventions had been initiated piecemeal, notably the Safety of Life at Sea Convention (SOLAS), first adopted in 1914 following the Titanic disaster. Under the name of the Inter-Governmental Maritime Consultative Organization (IMCO), IMO's first task was to update the SOLAS convention; the resulting 1960 convention was subsequently recast and updated in 1974 and it is that convention that has been subsequently modified and updated to adapt to changes in safety requirements and technology.

When IMCO began its operations in 1959 certain other pre-existing conventions were brought under its aegis, most notable the International Convention for the Prevention of Pollution of the Sea by Oil (OILPOL) 1954. In January 1959, IMO began to maintain and promote the 1954 OILPOL Convention. Under the guidance of IMO, the convention was amended in 1962, 1969, and 1971. The first meetings of the newly formed IMCO were held in London in 1959.

As oil trade and industry developed, many people in the industry began to recognise a need for further improvements in regards to oil pollution prevention at sea. This became increasingly apparent in 1967, when the tanker Torrey Canyon spilled 120,000 tons of crude oil when it ran aground entering the English Channel The Torrey Canyon grounding was the largest oil pollution incident recorded up to that time. This incident prompted a series of new conventions.

IMO held an emergency session of its council to deal with the need to readdress regulations pertaining to maritime pollution. In 1969, the IMO Assembly decided to host an international gathering in 1973 dedicated to this issue. The goal at hand was to develop an international agreement for controlling general environmental contamination by ships when out at sea. During the next few years IMO brought to the forefront a series of measures designed to prevent large ship accidents and to minimise their effects. It also detailed how to deal with the environmental threat caused by routine ship duties such as the cleaning of oil cargo tanks or the disposal of engine room wastes.  By tonnage, the aforementioned was a bigger problem than accidental pollution. The most significant development to come out of this conference was the International Convention for the Prevention of Pollution from Ships, 1973.  It covers not only accidental and operational oil pollution but also different types of pollution by chemicals, goods in packaged form, sewage, garbage and air pollution. The original MARPOL was signed on 17 February 1973, but did not come into force due to lack of ratifications. The current convention is a combination of 1973 Convention and the 1978 Protocol. It entered into force on 2 October 1983. As of May 2013, 152 states, representing 99.2 per cent of the world's shipping tonnage, are signatories to the MARPOL convention.

As well as updates to MARPOL and SOLAS, the IMO facilitated several updated international maritime conventions in the mid to late 20th century, including the International Convention on Load Lines in 1966 (replacing an earlier 1930 Convention), the International Regulations for Preventing Collisions at Sea in 1972 (also replacing an earlier set of rules) and the STCW Convention in 1978. In 1975, the assembly of the IMO decided that future conventions of the International Convention for the Safety of Life at Sea (SOLAS) and other IMO instruments should use SI units only. As such, sea transportation is one of few industrial areas that still commonly uses non-metric units such as the nautical mile (nmi) for distance and knots (kn) for speed or velocity.

In 1982, IMCO was renamed as the International Maritime Organization (IMO). Throughout its existence, the IMO has continued to produce new and updated conventions across a wide range of maritime issues covering not only safety of life and marine pollution but also encompassing safe navigation, search and rescue, wreck removal, tonnage measurement, liability and compensation, ship recycling, the training and certification of seafarers, and piracy. More recently SOLAS has been amended to bring an increased focus on maritime security through the International Ship and Port Facility Security (ISPS) Code. The IMO has also increased its focus on smoke emissions from ships. In 1983, the IMO established the World Maritime University in Malmö, Sweden and also facilitated the adoption of the IGC Code. In 1991, the IMO facilitated the adoption of the International Grain Code.

In December 2002, new amendments to the 1974 SOLAS Convention were enacted by the IMO. These amendments gave rise to the International Ship and Port Facility Security (ISPS) Code, which went into effect on 1 July 2004. The concept of the code is to provide layered and redundant defences against smuggling, terrorism, piracy, stowaways, etc. The ISPS Code required most ships and port facilities engaged in international trade to establish and maintain strict security procedures as specified in ship and port specific Ship Security Plans and Port Facility Security Plans.

Headquarters

The IMO headquarters are located in a large purpose-built building facing the River Thames on the Albert Embankment, in Lambeth, London. The organisation moved into its new headquarters in late 1982, with the building being officially opened by Queen Elizabeth II on 17 May 1983. The architects of the building were Douglass Marriott, Worby & Robinson. The front of the building is dominated by a seven-metre high, ten-tonne bronze sculpture of the bow of a ship, with a lone seafarer maintaining a look-out. The previous headquarters of IMO were at 101 Piccadilly (now the home of the Embassy of Japan), prior to that at 22 Berners Street in Fitzrovia and originally in Chancery Lane.

Structure
The IMO consists of an Assembly, a Council and five main Committees. The organization is led by a Secretary-General. A number of Sub-Committees support the work of the main technical committees.

Governance of IMO

The governing body of the International Maritime Organization is the Assembly which meets every two years. In between Assembly sessions a Council, consisting of 40 Member States elected by the Assembly, acts as the governing body. The technical work of the International Maritime Organization is carried out by a series of Committees. The Secretariat consists of some 300 international civil servants headed by a Secretary-General.

The current Secretary-General is Kitack Lim (South Korea), elected for a four-year term at the 114th session of the IMO Council in June 2015 and at the 29th session of the IMO's Assembly in November 2015. His mandate started on 1 January 2016. At the 31st session of the Assembly in 2019 he was re-appointed for a second term, ending on 31 December 2023.

Technical committees

The technical work of the International Maritime Organisation is carried out by five principal Committees. These include:
 The Maritime Safety Committee (MSC)
 The Marine environment Protection Committee (MEPC)
 The Legal Committee
 The Technical Cooperation Committee, for capacity building
 The Facilitation Committee, to simplify the documentation and formalities required in international shipping.

Maritime Safety Committee
It is regulated in the Article 28(a) of the Convention on the IMO:

The Maritime Safety Committee is the most senior of these and is the main Technical Committee; it oversees the work of its nine sub-committees and initiates new topics. One broad topic it deals with is the effect of the human element on casualties; this work has been put to all of the sub-committees, but meanwhile, the Maritime Safety Committee has developed a code for the management of ships which will ensure that agreed operational procedures are in place and followed by the ship and shore-side staff.

Sub-Committees
The MSC and MEPC are assisted in their work by a number of sub-committees which are open to all Member States. The committees are:

 Sub-Committee on Human Element, Training and Watchkeeping (HTW)
 Sub-Committee on Implementation of IMO Instruments (III)
 Sub-Committee on Navigation, Communications and Search and Rescue (NCSR)
 Sub-Committee on Pollution Prevention and Response (PPR)
 Sub-Committee on Ship Design and Construction (SDC)
 Sub-Committee on Ship Systems and Equipment (SSE)
 Sub-Committee on Carriage of Cargoes and Containers (CCC).

The names of the IMO sub-committees were changed in 2013. Prior to 2013 there were nine Sub-Committees as follows:

 Bulk Liquids and Gases (BLG)
 Carriage of Dangerous Goods, Solid Cargoes and Containers(DSC)
 Fire Protection (FP)
 Radio-communications and Search and Rescue (COMSAR)
 Safety of Navigation (NAV)
 Ship Design and Equipment (DE)
 Stability and Load Lines and Fishing Vessels Safety (SLF)
 Standards of Training and Watchkeeping (STW)
 Flag State Implementation (FSI)

Membership

To become a member of the IMO, a state ratifies a multilateral treaty known as the Convention on the International Maritime Organization. As of 2020, there are 175 member states of the IMO, which includes 174 of the UN member states plus the Cook Islands. The first state to ratify the convention was Canada in 1948. The three most recent members to join were Armenia and Nauru (which became IMO members in January and May 2018, respectively) and Botswana (which joined the IMO in October 2021).

These are the current members with the year they joined:

Albania (1993)
Algeria (1963)
Angola (1977)
Antigua and Barbuda (1986)
Argentina (1953)
Armenia (2018)
Australia (1952)
Austria (1975)
Azerbaijan (1995)
Bahamas (1976)
Bahrain (1976)
Bangladesh (1976)
Barbados (1970)
Belarus (2016)
Belgium (1951)
Belize (1990)
Benin (1980)
Bolivia (1987)
Bosnia and Herzegovina (1993)
Botswana (2021)
Brazil (1963)
Brunei Darussalam (1984)
Bulgaria (1960)
Cabo Verde (1976)
Cambodia (1961)
Cameroon (1961)
Canada (1948)
Chile (1972)
China (1973)
Colombia (1974)
Comoros (2001)
Congo (1975)
Cook Islands (2008)
Costa Rica (1981)
Côte d'Ivoire (1960)
Croatia (1992)
Cuba (1966)
Cyprus (1973)
Czechia (1993)
Democratic People's Republic of Korea (1986)
Democratic Republic of the Congo (1973)
Denmark (1959)
Djibouti (1979)
Dominica (1979)
Dominican Republic (1953)
Ecuador (1956)
Egypt (1958)
El Salvador (1981)
Equatorial Guinea (1972)
Eritrea (1993)
Estonia (1992)
Ethiopia (1975)
Fiji (1983)
Finland (1959)
France (1952)
Gabon (1976)
Gambia (1979)
Georgia (1993)
Germany (1959)
Ghana (1959)
Greece (1958)
Grenada (1998)
Guatemala (1983)
Guinea (1975)
Guinea-Bissau (1977)
Guyana (1980)
Haiti (1953)
Honduras (1954)
Hungary (1970)
Iceland (1960)
India (1959)
Indonesia (1961)
Iran (1958)
Iraq (1973)
Ireland (1951)
Israel (1952)
Italy (1957)
Jamaica (1976)
Japan (1958)
Jordan (1973)
Kazakhstan (1994)
Kenya (1973)
Kiribati (2003)
Kuwait (1960)
Latvia (1993)
Lebanon (1966)
Liberia (1959)
Libya (1970)
Lithuania (1995)
Luxembourg (1991)
Madagascar (1961)
Malawi (1989)
Malaysia (1971)
Maldives (1967)
Malta (1966)
Marshall Islands (1998)
Mauritania (1961)
Mauritius (1978)
Mexico (1954)
Monaco (1989)
Mongolia (1996)
Montenegro (2006)
Morocco (1962)
Mozambique (1979)
Myanmar (1951)
Namibia (1994)
Nauru (2018)
Nepal (1979)
Netherlands (1949)
New Zealand (1960)
Nicaragua (1982)
Nigeria (1962)
North Macedonia (1993)
Norway (1958)
Oman (1974)
Pakistan (1958)
Palau (2011)
Panama (1958)
Papua New Guinea (1976)
Paraguay (1993)
Peru (1968)
Philippines (1964)
Poland (1960)
Portugal (1976)
Qatar (1977)
Republic of Korea (1962)
Republic of Moldova (2001)
Romania (1965)
Russian Federation (1958)
Saint Kitts and Nevis (2001)
Saint Lucia (1980)
Saint Vincent and the Grenadines (1981)
Samoa (1996)
San Marino (2002)
São Tomé and Príncipe (1990)
Saudi Arabia (1969)
Senegal (1960)
Serbia (2000)
Seychelles (1978)
Sierra Leone (1973)
Singapore (1966)
Slovakia (1993)
Slovenia (1993)
Solomon Islands (1988)
Somalia (1978)
South Africa (1995)
Spain (1962)
Sri Lanka (1972)
Sudan (1974)
Suriname (1976)
Sweden (1959)
Switzerland (1955)
Syria (1963)
Tanzania (1974)
Thailand (1973)
Timor-Leste (2005)
Togo (1983)
Tonga (2000)
Trinidad and Tobago (1965)
Tunisia (1963)
Turkey (1958)
Turkmenistan (1993)
Tuvalu (2004)
Uganda (2009)
Ukraine (1994)
United Arab Emirates (1980)
United Kingdom (1949)
United States of America (1950)
Uruguay (1968)
Vanuatu (1986)
Venezuela (1975)
Viet Nam (1984)
Yemen (1979)
Zambia (2014)
Zimbabwe (2005)

The three associate members of the IMO are the Faroe Islands, Hong Kong and Macao.

In 1961, the territories of Sabah and Sarawak, which had been included through the participation of United Kingdom, became joint associate members. In 1963 they became part of Malaysia.

Most UN member states that are not members of IMO are landlocked countries. These include Afghanistan, Andorra, Bhutan, Burkina Faso, Burundi, Central African Republic, Chad, Kyrgyzstan, Laos, Lesotho, Liechtenstein, Mali, Niger, Rwanda, South Sudan, Swaziland, Tajikistan and Uzbekistan.  The Federated States of Micronesia, an island-nation in the Pacific Ocean, is also a non-member. Taiwan is neither a member of the IMO nor of the UN, although it has a major shipping industry.

Legal instruments

IMO is the source of approximately 60 legal instruments that guide the regulatory development of its member states to improve safety at sea, facilitate trade among seafaring states and protect the maritime environment. The most well known is the International Convention for the Safety of Life at Sea (SOLAS), as well as International Convention for the Prevention of Pollution from Ships (MARPOL). Others include the International Oil Pollution Compensation Funds (IOPC). It also functions as a depository of yet to be ratified treaties, such as the International Convention on Liability and Compensation for Damage in Connection with the Carriage of Hazardous and Noxious Substances by Sea, 1996 (HNS Convention) and Nairobi International Convention of Removal of Wrecks (2007).

IMO regularly enacts regulations, which are broadly enforced by national and local maritime authorities in member countries, such as the International Regulations for Preventing Collisions at Sea (COLREG). The IMO has also enacted a Port State Control (PSC) authority, allowing domestic maritime authorities such as coast guards to inspect foreign-flag ships calling at ports of the many port states. Memoranda of Understanding (protocols) were signed by some countries unifying Port State Control procedures among the signatories.

Conventions, Codes and Regulations:
MARPOL Convention
Marpol Annex I
SOLAS Convention
IMDG Code
ISM Code
ISPS Code
Polar Code
IGF Code
IGC Code
STCW Convention
International Code of Signals
International Ballast Water Management Convention
International Convention on Civil Liability for Oil Pollution Damage (CLC Convention)
International Convention on Maritime Search and Rescue (SAR Convention)
International Convention on Oil Pollution Preparedness, Response and Co-operation (OPRC)
HNS Convention
International Regulations for Preventing Collisions at Sea (COLREG)
International Convention on Load Lines (CLL)
International Convention on the Establishment of an International Fund for Compensation for Oil Pollution Damage (FUND92)
Convention for the Suppression of Unlawful Acts against the Safety of Maritime Navigation (SUA Convention)
International Convention on the Control of Harmful Anti-fouling Systems on Ships (AFS Convention)
The Casualty Investigation Code - enacted through Resolution MSC.255(84), of 16 May 2008. The full title is Code of the International Standards and Recommended Practices for a Safety Investigation into a Marine casualty or Marine Incident.

The IMO is also responsible for publishing the International Code of Signals for use between merchant and naval vessels.

Current priorities
Recent initiatives at the IMO have included amendments to SOLAS, which among other things, included upgraded fire protection standards on passenger ships, the International Convention on Standards of Training, Certification and Watchkeeping for Seafarers (STCW) which establishes basic requirements on training, certification and watchkeeping for seafarers and to the Convention on the Prevention of Maritime Pollution (MARPOL 73/78), which required double hulls on all tankers.

IMO has harmonised information available to seafarers and shore-side traffic services called e-Navigation. An e-Navigation strategy was ratified in 2005, and an implementation plan was developed through three IMO sub-committees. The plan was completed by 2014 and implemented in November of that year. IMO has also served as a key partner and enabler of US international and interagency efforts to establish Maritime Domain Awareness.

Environmental issues
The IMO has a role in tackling international climate change. The First Intersessional Meeting of IMO's Working Group on Greenhouse Gas Emissions from Ships took place in Oslo, Norway (23–27 June 2008), tasked with developing the technical basis for the reduction mechanisms that may form part of a future IMO regime to control greenhouse gas emissions from international shipping, and a draft of the actual reduction mechanisms themselves, for further consideration by IMO's Marine Environment Protection Committee (MEPC). The IMO participated in the 2015 United Nations Climate Change Conference in Paris seeking to establish itself as the "appropriate international body to address greenhouse gas emissions from ships engaged in international trade". Nonetheless, there has been widespread criticism of the IMO's relative inaction since the conclusion of the Paris conference, with the initial data-gathering step of a three-stage process to reduce maritime greenhouse emissions expected to last until 2020. In 2018, the Initial IMO Strategy on the reduction of GHG emissions from ships was adopted. In 2021, The New York Times wrote that the IMO "has repeatedly delayed and watered down climate regulations."

The IMO has also taken action to mitigate the global effects of ballast water and sediment discharge, through the 2004 Ballast Water Management Convention, which entered into force in September 2017.

Fishing safety
The IMO Cape Town Agreement is an international International Maritime Organization legal instrument established in 2012, that sets out minimum safety requirements for fishing vessels of 24 metres in length and over or equivalent in gross tons. The Agreement is not yet in force but the IMO is encouraging more member States to ratify the Agreement.

See also

 Active Shipbuilding Experts' Federation
 IMO ship identification number
 International Hydrographic Organization
 International Maritime Law Institute
 International Maritime Rescue Federation
 United Nations Convention on the Law of the Sea
 Standard Marine Communication Phrases developed by the IMO, to improve safety at sea
 NAVAREA

Notes and references

Further reading

External links
 International Maritime Organization
 List of IMO member states on www.imo.org 
 IMO: What It Is(2001)
 Convention:
 status
 text 
 IMO moved to Piccadilly in 1970

 
International organisations based in London
International water transport
Organisations based in the London Borough of Lambeth
Organizations established in 1948
United Nations specialized agencies
Water transport organizations
United Kingdom and the United Nations